Kisses for My President is a 1964 comedy film directed by Curtis Bernhardt and starring Fred MacMurray and Polly Bergen. Leslie McCloud (Bergen) makes history when she is elected the first female president of the United States. However, her husband Thad McCloud (MacMurray) is less enthusiastic. The picture's supporting cast features Eli Wallach, Arlene Dahl, Edward Andrews, and Donald May.

Kisses for My President was the last theatrical film directed by Bernhardt, whose career stretched back to the silent era.

Plot summary
The United States elects its first female president, Leslie Harrison McCloud (Polly Bergen). She and her husband (he is never called "first gentleman"; he is called "first lady" a few times early in the film, but typically "president's husband") Thad (Fred MacMurray) move into the White House with their daughter Gloria (Ahna Capri) and son Peter (Ronnie Dapo).

Immediately, the new president is too busy for her husband and family as she deals with powerful opposition from Senator Walsh (Edward Andrews) and a Central American dictator, Raphael Valdez Jr. (Eli Wallach).

Thad attempts to find something meaningful to do as the president's husband. He is upset with his feminine bedroom and office within the White House.

Doris Reid Weaver (Arlene Dahl), Thad's former flame and now an international business woman, wants Thad back. During a seductive visit, she offers to make him vice president of her cosmetics company as bait. Leslie smells Doris's perfume on her husband that night and confronts him.

Leslie asks Thad to show visiting dictator Valdez around Washington, with disastrous results, as Thad brawls with a male diner at a burlesque show. To further complicate things, the first daughter is running around town with a very unsuitable boyfriend and using her position to get out of scrapes with the police. First son Peter has become a bully, using his Secret Service men for protection as he terrorizes everyone in his school, including the principal.

The president's husband finds an important role in a Cold War subplot that resembles the rise and fall of Senator McCarthy, when Thad proves that Senator Walsh blindly supports the Latin American dictator for reasons that are not patriotic. Senator Walsh aggressively portrays the lady president as weak in resisting communism because she refuses to give Valdez more foreign aid for his personal enrichment while he does nothing to alleviate poverty in his country. The Soviets are also co-funding Valdez to prevent him from being influenced exclusively by the United States. As soon as the president drops her support for the dictator, the Soviets do so as well.

Leslie then discovers that she is pregnant, and resigns the presidency to devote herself full-time to her family.

Cast
 Fred MacMurray as Thad McCloud 
 Polly Bergen as U.S. President Leslie McCloud 
 Eli Wallach as Raphael Valdez Jr. 
 Arlene Dahl as Doris Reid Weaver 
 Edward Andrews as Sen. Walsh 
 Donald May as Secret Service Agent John O'Connor 
 Harry Holcombe as Vice President Bill Richards 
 Ahna Capri as Gloria McCloud (as Anna Capri) 
 Ronnie Dapo as Peter McCloud 
 Richard St. John as Jackson 
 Bill Walker as Joseph 
 Adrienne Marden as Miss Higgins 
 Wilbert G. Nuttycombe as Musician
 Norma Varden as Miss Dinsendorff 
 John Banner as Soviet Ambassador  
 Jon Lormer as Chief Justice of the Supreme Court
 Eleanor Audley as Principal Osgood
 Beverly Power as Nana Peel
 Lillian Bronson as Miss Currier

Reception
Bosley Crowther of The New York Times panned the movie, commenting, "...All that one can say is that we hope the first woman to become President brings along a more amusing husband than Mr. MacMurray and a more imaginative team of writers than Mr. Binyon and Mr. Kane." He also criticized Bernhardt for taking "a dim view of the prospect of a woman as President. It wouldn't be funny! That's what his picture says."

See also
 List of American films of 1964

References

External links 
 
 
 
 

1964 films
1964 comedy films
American political comedy films
American political satire films
American black-and-white films
Films about fictional presidents of the United States
Films directed by Curtis Bernhardt
Films scored by Bronisław Kaper
Films set in Washington, D.C.
Warner Bros. films
1960s English-language films
1960s American films